The Graduate School of Agri-Food Management and Economics, or SMEA, is a specializing school of Università Cattolica del Sacro Cuore.

History
SMEA was born in Cremona in 1984 as the School of Specialization and Master in Economics of Agro-Food System initiative of the Faculty of Agricultural Economics and Catholic. Since 1997, the SMEA is part of ASFOR. Since 2005 is part of the system of Università Cattolica's Postgraduate Schools.

Courses
Management of the Agricultural and Food System
Agribusiness
Master of Science in Agricultural and Food Economics
Agricultural and food market institutions 
Agricultural and food marketing 
Economics of agricultural and food markets
Business planning and control

References

External links
  

Università Cattolica del Sacro Cuore
Universities and colleges in Lombardy
Cremona
Agricultural organisations based in Italy
Graduate schools in Italy
Educational institutions established in 1984
1984 establishments in Italy